The Kom people are one of the indigenous ethnic groups who had settled in Manipur alongside the Meiteis (with reference to the Khamba Thoibi epic folklore) and they are defined later by British Indian government as Naga in their land records (administratively) but later after the entry of kuki from Burma during 1847, the anthropologist and historian considered them linguistically a kin to chin-kuki-mizo group. They are mainly found in Manipur  of North-East India. 

According to the 2001 Census of India, the population of Kom is 14,602.

Gallery

References 

Ethnic groups in India
Kuki tribes
Scheduled Tribes of Manipur
Ethnic groups in Northeast India
Ethnic groups in South Asia